Mazhukeer is a village that lies in the Alappuzha district of Kerala in India. This village begins from "arattupuzha bridge", which connects Pathanamthitta district and allapuzha district and lies up to a church near Kallissery junction. The Varattar River is the eastern boundary of Mazhukeer. Mazhukeer is divided into "Mel Mazukeer" (Upper Mazhukeer) and "Keez Mazukeer" (Lower Mazhukeer).

References

Villages in Alappuzha district